Oberea leucothrix is a species of beetle in the family Cerambycidae. It was described by Toyoshima in 1982.

References

leucothrix
Beetles described in 1982